The United States Congress established the Abraham Lincoln Study Abroad Commission in 2005 to develop the framework for an international study abroad program for college students that would subsidize and stimulate infrastructure to send one million American college students to study abroad every year by 2017.  The bill was sponsored by Sen. Richard J. Durbin of Illinois (D), and inspired by the lobbying of Senator Paul Simon, who believed, in the aftermath of the September 11th attacks on the United States, that one of the most constructive ways to defend against future vulnerabilities in an increasingly connected world would be to encourage international education by subsidizing oversea study for college students.

While the bill died in committee, it is frequently invoked in discussions of "the international education deficit"—the imbalance between the number of international students studying in the United States and the number of American students studying abroad. The bill inspired IFSA-Butler and Arcadia University to form the Alliance for Global Education, an organization designed to facilitate Study Abroad experiences in China, India, and other Asian countries which had previously been off-the-beaten-track, in terms of study abroad opportunities for US students.

References

Study abroad programs